Tine Köhler is a social scientist and Professor for International Management in the Department of Management and Marketing at the University of Melbourne, Australia. She is currently the co-editor of  Organizational Research Methods, along with serving on the editorial board for Small Group Research and the Journal of Management Education. She is also the co-founder of Women in Research Methods.

Recognition 

Köhler has won several awards. These include the Best Reviewer Award from the Australia and New Zealand Academy of Management – Management Education and Training Stream in 2018 and Management Education Division Global Forum Best Symposium Award (Winner) in 2016. She has also been awarded grants by the U.S.-based National Science Foundation, Canadian Social Sciences and Humanities Research Council, the University of Melbourne, and George Mason University, to support her research projects. Köhler publishes research in several different journals such as the Industrial and Organizational Psychology and Entrepreneurship Theory and Practice journals.

Education and career 
Köhler has a Ph.D in Psychology from George Mason University, an MA in Psychology from George Mason University, and PreDiploma in Psychology from Phillips-Universitat Marburg.

Prior to her work at the University of Melbourne, she was a leadership development consultant for the International Finance Corporation (World Bank Group, USA).

Starting in January 2022 Köhler will serve as co-editor of the journal Organizational Research Methods, a position she shares with Lisa Schurer Lambert.

References

External links 
 Organizational Research Methods website
 Women in Research Methods website

Australian social scientists
George Mason University alumni
Academic staff of the University of Melbourne

Living people
Year of birth missing (living people)